Lucerapex raulini is an extinct species of sea snail, a marine gastropod mollusk in the family Turridae, the turrids.

Distribution
Fossils of this extinct species were found in Oligocene strata in the Landes, France.

References

 Peyrot, A. "Conchologie Néogénique de 1’Aquitaine; Conidea." Actes de la Société Linnéenne de Bordeaux 82 (1931): 73–120.
 Lozouet P. (2017). Les Conoidea de l'Oligocène supérieur (Chattien) du bassin de l'Adour (Sud-Ouest de la France). Cossmanniana. 19: 3–180.

raulini
Gastropods described in 1931
Oligocene gastropods